Kristine Howard (born June 7, 1961) is a Democratic member of the Pennsylvania House of Representatives, representing the 167th legislative district. She was first elected on November 6, 2018.

Howard is from Malvern, Pennsylvania, and has degrees from the University of Pennsylvania and Rutgers Law School. She worked in New Mexico running a legal and social services organization before moving back to Pennsylvania to advocate for youth in foster care as a part of the Philadelphia Volunteer Lawyers for the Arts. Howard investigated child abuse in Chester County, when she worked at the Chester County Department of Children, Youth, and Family Services.

References
 

Democratic Party members of the Pennsylvania House of Representatives
People from Malvern, Pennsylvania
University of Pennsylvania alumni
Rutgers University alumni
Living people
1961 births
Women state legislators in Pennsylvania
21st-century American women politicians
Politicians from Chester County, Pennsylvania